Massimo Susic (born 11 March 1967 in Mossa) is an Italian former professional footballer who played as a defender.

Honours
Parma
 UEFA Cup: 1994–95

1967 births
Living people
Italian footballers
Italy under-21 international footballers
Association football defenders
Serie A players
Serie B players
Udinese Calcio players
Parma Calcio 1913 players
A.C.R. Messina players
Pisa S.C. players
U.S. Cremonese players
Treviso F.B.C. 1993 players
A.C. Monza players
U.S. Triestina Calcio 1918 players
UEFA Cup winning players